The 179th Infantry Regiment ("Tomahawks") is an infantry regiment of the United States Army's National Guard.

Currently, the 1st Battalion is the only active battalion in the regiment and is organized as a combined arms battalion under the brigade unit of action table of organization and equipment. The battalion is an organic element of the 45th Infantry Brigade Combat Team of the Oklahoma Army National Guard.

Lineage
 Constituted 2 May 1890 in the Oklahoma Volunteer Militia as the 1st Infantry Regiment
 Organized 21 December 1895 from new and existing militia companies as the 1st Infantry Regiment, with headquarters at Guthrie (Oklahoma Volunteer Militia concurrently redesignated as the Oklahoma National Guard)
 Consolidated of Arizona and New Mexico to form the 1st Regiment Territorial Volunteer Infantry, United States Volunteers, and mustered into federal service 4–23 July 1898; mustered out of federal service 11–15 February 1899 at Albany, Georgia
 Former 1st Infantry Regiment, Oklahoma National Guard, reorganized in 1899 as the 1st Regiment of Infantry, with headquarters at Guthrie
 Mustered into federal service 27 out of federal service 1 March 1917 at Fort Sill, Oklahoma
 Called into federal service 31 March 1917; drafted into federal service 5 August 1917
 Consolidated 15 October 1917 with the 7th Infantry, Texas National Guard, and consolidated unit redesignated as the 142d Infantry, an element of the 36th Division
 Demobilized 17 June 1919 at Camp Bowie, Texas
 Central Oklahoma elements of former 142d Infantry merged during 1920–1921 with elements of the 2d Infantry (organized and federally recognized 31 August 1918 in Central Oklahoma, with headquarters at Chandler), to form the 2d Infantry, with headquarters at Oklahoma City (former elements of the 142d Infantry in the eastern part of the state merged with the 3d Infantry—hereafter, separate lineage)
 Redesignated 14 October 1921 as Division
 Inducted into federal service 16 September Oklahoma City
 (45th 1942 as the 45th Infantry Division)
 Inactivated 17–29 November 1945 at Camp Bowie, Texas
 Reorganized 10 September 1946 in the Oklahoma National Guard as the 179th Infantry, with headquarters federally recognized at Edmond
 Ordered into active federal service 1 September 1950 at Edmond
 (179th Infantry [NGUS] organized and federally recognized 15 September 1952 with headquarters at Edmond)
 Released from active federal service 20 April 1954 and reverted to state control; federal recognition concurrently withdrawn from the 179th Infantry (NGUS)
 Reorganized (less 2d Battalion) 1 May 1959 as the 179th Infantry, a parent regiment under the Combat Arms Regimental System, to consist of the 1st and 2d Battle Groups, elements of the 45th Infantry Division (2d Battalion concurrently reorganized as the 2d Reconnaissance Squadron, 245th Armor—hereafter separate lineage)
 Reorganized 1 April 1963 to consist of the 1st and 2d Battalions, elements of the 45th Infantry Division
 Reorganized 1 February 1968 to consist of the 1st Battalion, and relieved from assignment to the 45th Infantry Division
 (Location of headquarters changed 1 April 1979 to Stillwater)
 Withdrawn 1 May 1989 from the Combat Arms Regimental System and reorganized under the United States Army Regimental System
 Ordered into active federal service 30 November 2002 at home stations; released from active federal service 26 August 2003 and reverted to state control
 Redesignated 1 October 2005 as the 179th Infantry Regiment
 Ordered into active federal service 20 October 2007 at home stations; released from active federal service 22 November 2008 and reverted to state control
 Assigned 1 September 2008 to the 45th Infantry Brigade Combat Team
 Ordered into active federal service 27 March 2011 at home stations

Current units
1st Battalion is a subordinate unit of the 45th Infantry Brigade Combat Team, headquartered in Edmond, Oklahoma. The battalion commands six companies. These units are:
 Headquarters and Headquarters Company, 1st Battalion, 179th Infantry Regiment (Edmond, Oklahoma)
 Company A, 1st Battalion, 179th Infantry Regiment (rifle company) (El Reno, Oklahoma)
 Company B, 1st Battalion, 179th Infantry Regiment (rifle company) (Enid, Oklahoma)
 Company C, 1st Battalion, 179th Infantry Regiment (rifle company) (Edmond, Oklahoma)
 Company D, 1st Battalion, 179th Infantry Regiment (heavy weapons company) (Ponca City, Oklahoma)
 Company H, 700th Support Battalion (forward support company) (Stillwater, Oklahoma)

Campaign streamers
World War I
 Meuse-Argonne
World War II
 Sicily (with Arrowhead)
 Naples-Foggia (with Arrowhead)
 Anzio
 Rome-Arno
 Southern France (with Arrowhead)
 Rhineland
 Ardennes-Alsace
 Central Europe

Korean War
 Second Korean winter
 Korea, Summer-Fall 1952
 Third Korean winter
 Korea, Summer 1953

Global War On Terrorism

Operation Iraqi Freedom
 Iraq Surge 2008
Operation Enduring Freedom
 Consolidation III - (1 DECEMBER 2009 – 30 JUNE 2011)
 Transition I - (1 JULY 2011 - TO A DATE TO BE DETERMINED)

Battlefield or campaign honors and awards

Unit Decorations 
 French Croix de Guerre with Palm awarded to 45th Infantry Division for action from 1–31 January 1944 at Acquafondata
 Army Meritorious Unit Commendation, Iraq 2008
Additionally, the following units are entitled to the Meritorious Unit Citation
A Company, 1st Battalion, 179th Infantry Regiment
B Company, 1st Battalion, 179th Infantry Regiment
C Company, 1st Battalion, 179th Infantry Regiment
Per DAGO 208-11 (Corrected Copy) (2011)
 *B Company, 1st Battalion, 179th Infantry Regiment
Per DAGO 2009-23 (2009)

Streamers 
 Meritorious Unit Commendation (Army), Streamer embroidered IRAQ 2008

References

External links
 Warren P. Munsell: ''The Story of a Regiment, the history of the 179th Regimental Combat Team (1946) 
 http://www.45thdivision.org/Photo_Gallery/gallery_179th.htm

179
179
Military units and formations established in 1890
179
United States Army units and formations in the Korean War